Robert Benjamin Hicks III (January 30, 1951 – February 25, 2022) was an American author. He wrote The New York Times Bestseller The Widow of the South and has played a major role in preserving the historic Carnton mansion, a focal point in the Battle of Franklin which occurred on November 30, 1864. Nashville Lifestyles Magazine recently named Robert as the #2 in the top 100 Reasons to Love Nashville, describing him as Nashville's "Master of Ceremonies".

Life and career
Robert Hicks was born in West Palm Beach, Florida, on January 30, 1951. He moved to Williamson County, Tennessee, in 1974 and lived near the Bingham Community at "Labor in Vain," his late-eighteenth-century log cabin.

Working over the years as a music publisher and in artist management in both country and alternative-rock music, Hicks's interests have remained varied.  A partner in the B. B. King's Blues Clubs in Nashville,  Memphis, Orlando and Los Angeles, Hicks served as "Curator of Vibe" for the corporation.

A lifelong collector, Hicks was the first Tennessean to be listed among Art & Antiquess Top 100 Collectors in America –- his collection focuses on outsider art by artists such as Howard Finster and B.F.Perkins, Tennesseana, and Southern Material Culture.  He served as curator on the exhibition, Art of Tennessee, at the Frist Center for the Visual Arts in Nashville. The exhibition was a seven-year endeavor from conception at his kitchen table to its opening, September 2003. He was co-editor of the exhibition's award-winning and critically acclaimed catalog, Art of Tennessee.

Hicks died from cancer near Franklin, Tennessee, on February 25, 2022, at the age of 71.

Historic preservation
In the field of historic preservation, he has served on the boards of the Tennessee State Museum, The Williamson County Historical Society, and the Museum of Early Southern Decorative Arts in Winston-Salem, North Carolina. He served on the board of directors of the Ogden Museum of Southern Art in New Orleans and of Historic Carnton Plantation in Franklin, Tennessee.

In December 1997, after a third term as President of the Carnton board, and in light of his years of service to the site, Hicks was named by board resolution: "the driving force in the restoration and preservation of Historic Carnton Plantation."

He was founding chairman emeritus of "Franklin's Charge: A Vision and Campaign for the Preservation of Historic Open Space" in the fight to secure and preserve both battlefield and other historic open space in Williamson County.  Franklin's Charge took on the massive mission of saving what remains of the eastern flank of the battlefield at Franklin -– the largest remaining undeveloped fragment of the battlefield -– and turning it into a public battlefield park. The American Battlefield Protection Program has called this endeavor "the largest battlefield reclamation in North American history." By the end of 2005, Franklin's Charge had already raised over 5 million dollars toward this goal, surpassing anything ever done within any other community in America to preserve battlefield open space. As Jim Lighthizer, President of the Civil War Preservation Trust has said, "There is no 'close second' in any community in America, to what Robert Hicks and Franklin's Charge has done in Franklin." The Governor named Hicks as a commissioner to plan out the 150th Anniversary of the Civil War in Tennessee.

Novels

The Widow of the South
Hicks became fascinated by the Battle of Franklin, Tennessee, a major battle which occurred in the final months of the Civil War. During his many years working at Carnton, he began to develop a book idea, and during an accidental meeting with civil war historian and author Shelby Foote, he received further encouragement to complete a historic novel about the battle.

The result was Hicks' first novel, The Widow of the South. In writing the novel, he hoped to bring national attention back to this moment in American history, the impact those five bloody hours played in making America a nation, and in the preservation of the sites tied to the story. The Widow of the South was launched September 1, 2005 to overwhelming critical success, entering the New York Times Bestseller List after only one week out.

The novel is centered around the Carnton Plantation and mansion which was commandeered by officers of the Confederate States Army as a hospital during the Battle of Franklin II. Hicks creates a cast of characters including the Madame of the mansion and soldiers wounded during this monumental battle. The novel has been critically acclaimed as comparable to other literary works on the Civil War including Gone with the Wind, and The Killer Angels.

In December 2005, Nashville's The Tennessean named him "Tennessean of the Year" for the impact The Widow of the South had on Tennessee, heritage tourism and preservation.

A Separate Country
Hicks' second novel, A Separate Country was released on September 23, 2009.

The novel is set in New Orleans in the years after the Civil War.  It is based on the incredible life of John Bell Hood, arguably one of the most controversial generals of the Confederate Army—and one of its most tragic figures. Robert E. Lee promoted him to major general after the Battle of Antietam. But the Civil War would mark him forever. At Gettysburg, he lost the use of his left arm. At the Battle of Chickamauga, his right leg was amputated. Starting fresh after the war, he married Anna Marie Hennen and fathered 11 children with her, including three sets of twins. But fate had other plans. Crippled by his war wounds and defeat, ravaged by financial misfortune, Hood had one last foe to battle: yellow fever.

Other writings and presentations
Hicks's essays on regional history, southern material culture, furniture and music have appeared in numerous publications over the years. Hicks wrote op-eds for The New York Times on contemporary politics in the South. He was also a regular contributor to Garden & Gun.

He traveled, throughout the nation, speaking on a variety of topics ranging from "Why The South Matters to The Importance of Fiction in Preserving History to Southern Material Culture" to "A Model for the Preservation of Historic Open Space for Every Community".

Hicks's first book, a collaboration with French-American photographer Michel Arnaud, came out in 2000: Nashville: the Pilgrims of Guitar Town.

He was co-editor (with Justin Stelter and John Bohlinger) of a collection of short stories, A Guitar and A Pen: Short Stories and Story-Songs By Nashville Songwriters.

He has also written the introduction to two books on historic preservation authored by photographer, Nell Dickerson:
GONE: A Photographic Plea for Preservation
and Porch Dogs.

In January 2016 Hicks was a panelist and featured speaker at the third annual Rancho Mirage Writers Festival in Rancho Mirage, CA. Along with American historian H.W. Brands, Hicks took part in the panel discussion "The War that Forged a Nation: Why the Civil War Matters."

Battlefield Bourbon
To commemorate the 150th anniversary of the Battle of Franklin, in 2014 Hicks released the first small batch of his bourbon whiskey Battlefield Bourbon. Each of the 1,864 bottles is numbered and signed by Hicks. About his decision to release Battlefield Bourbon he said, "My decision to only produce 1,864 bottles of Battlefield Bourbon this year makes it pretty much the smallest batch of small batch bourbon anywhere. Yet, it only seemed right as I promised myself that whatever I produced would be really good and really rare. Besides, as I am signing and numbering every bottle, I figured that I needed to protect the old signing hand and 1,864 bottles seemed like enough. Of course, 1864 is the year of the Battle of Franklin, which this sesquicentennial commemoration is all about."

References

External links
The Carnton Plantation website
Brief Bio on Robert Hicks
Hachette Book Group website for A Separate Country
Robert Hicks website
Franklin's Charge website
B. B. Kings Blues Clubs website
Review in the Chattanoogan newspaper dated December 1, 2005 about Robert Hicks
The McGavock Confederate Cemetery at Franklin

1951 births
2022 deaths
21st-century American male writers
21st-century American novelists
American art collectors
American historical novelists
American male novelists
Novelists from Florida
Novelists from Tennessee
People from West Palm Beach, Florida
Writers from Nashville, Tennessee